Kim Chernin (May 7, 1940 – December 17, 2020) was an American feminist writer, poet, and memoirist.

Biography 
Chernin was born on May 7, 1940, in the Bronx, New York. Her parents, Rose Chernin and Paul Kusnitz, were Russian-born Jewish immigrants.  Rose Chernin was an organizer for the Communist Party and founded the Los Angeles Committee for the Protection of the Foreign Born.  Paul Kusnitz was a teacher of Marxism for the Communist Party. Chernin's childhood was influenced by the death of her older sister, Nina, to Hodgkin's lymphoma.

Shortly after Nina's death, the Kusnitz family relocated to Los Angeles to be near relatives. Her mother resumed full-time work as a party organizer and in 1951 made national headline news when she was arrested for "advocating the overthrow of the government." Rose Chernin was later called before the House Un-American Activities Committee for her work as a party organizer. The U.S. government tried unsuccessfully to denaturalize her and deprive her of citizenship for such activities.

Kim Chernin was active as an organizer of the LYL Labor Youth League and, upon graduation from high school, traveled to Moscow for the Seventh World Festival of Youth and Students. In her memoir, In My Mother's House,  Chernin writes:

Chernin moved to Berkeley to attend the University of California, Berkeley and married David Netboy at the age of 18. In 1963, her only child, Larissa, was born while she was studying at Trinity College, Dublin. She divorced seven years later, subsequently also marrying and divorcing Robert Cantor, before settling into a long-term relationship with her life-companion  Renate Stendhal, with whom she co-wrote Sex and Other Sacred Games, Cecilia Bartoli: The Passion of Song and Lesbian Marriage: A Love & Sex Forever Kit. She lived for many years in Point Reyes, California, where she wrote and worked as a pastoral counselor. She was a guest instructor at the San Francisco Psychoanalytic Institute. She was featured on radio, including National Public Radio.  She was the recipient of an NEA grant for fiction.

She died from COVID-19 during the COVID-19 pandemic in California.

Writing
Kim Chernin's work spans a number of different genres: memoir, fiction, poetry, psychological study, and a study of women's search for self.

Chernin has written a trilogy of books about women and eating disorders,  Obsession: Reflections on the Tyranny of Slenderness, The Hungry Self: Women, Eating and Identity, and Reinventing Eve: Modern Woman in Search of Herself.

In The Flame Bearers, which was a 1987 New York Times Notable Book, Chernin challenges women's exclusion from traditional Judaism. Chernin creates the Flame Bearers, a sect of women who are Jewish, yet not traditional observers; when these women read the Holy Book, they reconstruct Old Testament stories to reassert the days before women were excluded from Orthodoxy.

In My Mother's House describes the mother-to-daughter bonding between generations of Chernin women, effected through Rose's telling of tales and through daughter Kim's ability to set them down.  Of In My Mother's House, Chernin says: "Writing that book I was ... preoccupied with the struggle to be different from my mother."

Cecilia Bartoli: The Passion of Song is a biography of Cecilia Bartoli, the opera singer and recitalist, written with Renate Stendhal.

Chernin's work has frequently been praised by renowned feminist writer Alice Walker. Her papers were acquired by the Schlesinger Library of Harvard University in 2003.

Her collection of essays on the Zionist struggle, Everywhere a Guest, Nowhere at Home: A New Vision of Israel and Palestine, was released on September 1, 2009.

Her latest book and third collaboration with Renate Stendhal, Lesbian Marriage: A Love & Sex Forever kit, was released in 2014 and focuses on counseling and coaching soon-to-be and married lesbian couples.

Books

Non-fiction
 The Obsession: Reflections on the Tyranny of Slenderness: Harper & Row (1981); 
 The Hungry Self: Women, Eating and Identity: Times Books (1985); 
 Reinventing Eve: Modern Woman in Search of Herself: Times Books (1987); 
 The Woman Who Gave Birth to Her Mother: Viking (1998); 
 Seven Pillars of Jewish Denial: Shekinah, Wagner, and the Politics of the Small: North Atlantic Books (March 2, 2004); 
 Everywhere a Guest, Nowhere at Home: A New Vision of Israel and Palestine: North Atlantic Books (September 1, 2009); 
 Lesbian Marriage: A Love & Sex Forever Kit: Lesbian Love Forever (2014);

Poetry
 The Hunger Song: The Menard Press (January 1983);

Fiction
 The Flame Bearers: A Novel: Random House (1986); 
 Sex and Other Sacred Games: Crown (July 1, 1989);  (with Renate Stendhal)
 The Girl Who Went and Saw and Came Back: Edgework Books; (February 2002);

Memoirs
 In My Mother's House: Ticknor & Fields (1983); 
 Crossing the Border: An Erotic Autobiography: The Women's Press Ltd (October 13, 1994); 
 A Different Kind of Listening: My Psychoanalysis and Its Shadow: Perennial (January 1996); 
 In My Father's Garden: A Daughter's Search for a Spiritual Life: Algonquin Books (January 7, 1996); 
 My Life as a Boy: A Woman's Story: Algonquin Books (January 5, 1997);

Biography
 Cecilia Bartoli: The Passion of Song: Trafalgar Square Publishing; (November 1999);  (with Renate Stendhal)

References

External links
 Jewish Women and the Feminist Revolution from the Jewish Women's Archive
 Women's Movement and Girl's Club
 A Conversation on Lesbian Marriage

1940 births
2020 deaths
American feminist writers
American memoirists
Jewish American writers
American people of Russian-Jewish descent
American women poets
American lesbian writers
American LGBT poets
American women memoirists
Writers from the Bronx
People from Point Reyes, California
Lesbian memoirists
Deaths from the COVID-19 pandemic in California